Riku Kiri (born April 5, 1963 in Kotka, Finland) is a Finnish former strongman and powerlifter, best known for competing in the World's Strongest Man competition, narrowly missing out on capturing the title on more than one occasion. He has been referred to as: "the strongest man never to win World's Strongest Man."

Life and career
The 1.94 m (6 ft 4 in), 145 kg (320 lb) Kiri is particularly noted for his static strength including a 300 kg (661.4 lb) single-arm deadlift and a 302.5 kg (666.9 lbs) raw bench press. He squatted 440 kg in the Dutch Open strongman contest of 1995 in a Smith machine apparatus. He also bench pressed 290.0 kg (639.3 lb) raw in an official WPC meet along with many other records. At 19 years old in 1983, Riku held a World Record in powerlifting in the squat lift in IPF competition, 350 kg (125 kg weight category).

In one of his first ever strongest man contests, he defeated reigning World's Strongest Man winner Jón Páll Sigmarsson, in 1985.

For most of his appearances in World's Strongest Man competition, Kiri has been hampered by ankle injuries. Although Kiri placed 3rd and 2nd respectively in 1993 and 1996, ankle injuries plagued him during both contests. In reference to the Car Carry event in 1993, Kiri's coach, Markku Suonenvirta, famously said: "His ankle is broken but he's a tough guy." Kiri's ankle was in fact not broken but badly injured and weakened. In the 1996 WSM final event (Power Stairs) Kiri was about to go head to head with Magnus Ver Magnusson. However, just after the starter's whistle, Kiri dropped out due to another ankle injury. Kiri was also forced to drop out of the 1998 World's Strongest Man final due to an ankle injury, finishing in 6th place.

His background is in security work, and he holds shares in Gold's Gym-Helsinki.

Powerlifting
Training records:

Squat:  raw
Bench Press:  raw
Deadlift:  raw
 Best deadlift set: 7 x , 4 x  raw
Total:  raw

References

External links

Interview at Samson Power

Finnish strength athletes
1963 births
Living people
Finnish powerlifters
People from Kotka
Sportspeople from Kymenlaakso